was a Japanese female idol group under the management of Stardust Promotion. They come from the Kansai region. On April 18, 2021, Tacoyaki Rainbow announced that their members will "graduate" from the group on May 9 the same year. The group was supposed to go on a reboot after that, but due to various problems, on March 31, 2022, it was announced that it would disband instead. The group's last-ever activity was on May 4, 2022, at the Asia and Pacific Trade Center.

Members

Timeline

Discography

Indie Singles

Major-label singles

Albums

References

External links 
 
 
 Tacoyaki Rainbow's official Ameblo blog

Japanese girl groups
Japanese idol groups
Japanese pop music groups
Musical groups established in 2012
Musical groups disestablished in 2022
2012 establishments in Japan
2022 disestablishments in Japan
Child musical groups
Warner Music Japan artists
Stardust Promotion artists